The Samara is a river in Russia and a left-bank tributary of the Volga. It flows into the larger river at the city of Samara. Its largest tributary is the Bolshoy Kinel.

Honours
The asteroid 26922 Samara was named in honour of the river and city on 1 June 2007.

References

Rivers of Samara Oblast